Pagaruša is a village in the municipality of Studeničani, North Macedonia.

History 
During the great migration movements in Macedonia at the end of the 17th and beginning of the 18th centuries, Muslims from Macedonia left the Debar area for the central regions of Macedonia and established villages such as Pagaruša located in the Skopje area.

Demographics
Pagaruša has traditionally been inhabited by a Muslim's from Macedonia (Torbeš) population. The mother tongue of Pagaruša inhabitants and of daily communication is Macedonian. The village has undergone some depopulation as villagers have migrated to Turkey or nearby Skopje and surrounding villages in North Macedonia. Though most Macedonian Muslims are Sunni, in Pagaruša followers of Sufi Islam are present attached to various Sufi orders such as the Melami, Halveti.

According to the 2021 census, the village had a total of 181 inhabitants. Ethnic groups in the village include:

Turks 147
Albanians 9
Others 25

See also 
 Muslims from Macedonia (Torbeši)

References

Villages in Studeničani Municipality
Macedonian Muslim villages
Turkish communities in North Macedonia